KSGC (92.1 FM) was a radio station  broadcasting a Hot Adult Contemporary format. It is licensed to Tusayan, Arizona, United States. The station was owned by Tusayan Broadcasting Company, Inc. and featured programming from ABC Radio.

History
The station went on the air as KRBZ in November 1984.  In June 1991 the station changed its call sign to the current KSGC. The station went dark in April 2009 after the loss of its broadcast tower. Call letters KSGC now refer to a station in Garden City, Kansas.

References

External links
 

SGC
Defunct radio stations in the United States
Radio stations established in 1984
Radio stations disestablished in 2009
1984 establishments in Arizona
2009 disestablishments in Arizona
SGC